David Crowe is a comedian from Seattle, Washington, USA. He was the winner of the 1996 San Francisco Stand-up Comedy competition and winner of the 1995 Seattle Stand-up Comedy competition.

He once opened for President Bill Clinton.

Frank and Funny 
In 2012, Crowe partnered with Compendium Inc. to release his own line of greeting cards called Frank and Funny. The line has been well reviewed by the greeting card industry and was available in stores across the US including Cost Plus World Markets.

Videography 
Crooked Finger, David Crowe Productions (2005)

References

External links 
Crowe website

Crowe at Comedy Central
Crowe at the Edinburgh Fringe Festival, 2005
Crowe at ComedyCV website

American male comedians
21st-century American comedians
Living people
People from Seattle
Year of birth missing (living people)